Scaphidema is a genus of beetles belonging to the family Tenebrionidae.

The species of this genus are found in Europe, Japan and Northern America.

Species:
 Scaphidema aeneola (LeConte, 1850) 
 Scaphidema formosanum Masumoto, 1982

References

Tenebrionidae